Artur Semenov (born 21 October 1994) is a Belarusian professional footballer.

References

External links 
 
 

1994 births
Living people
Sportspeople from Vitebsk
Belarusian footballers
Association football goalkeepers
FC Dinamo Minsk players
FC Bereza-2010 players
FC Naftan Novopolotsk players
FC Granit Mikashevichi players
FC Slonim-2017 players